The Queensland Railways B18¼ class locomotive was a class of 4-6-2 steam locomotives operated by the Queensland Railways.

History
The first batch of 17 B18¼ class locomotive were built by the North Ipswich Railway Workshops in 1926. Per Queensland Railway's classification system they were designated the B18 class, B representing they had three driving axles, and the 18 the cylinder diameter in inches.

Further orders saw the class total 83 by 1947 with some built by Walkers Limited. The latter examples were fitted with modified boilers and improved cabs. The early examples were painted prussian blue with the boilers having a natural finish. The latter examples were painted black with red lining. In 1949 all were repainted green with red lining. From 1951 they began to be relegated following the delivery of the BB18¼ class. The first was withdrawn in March 1967, with the last removed from traffic in 1970.

Preservation
771 has been preserved at the Workshops Rail Museum.

References

External links

Railway locomotives introduced in 1926
B18
Walkers Limited locomotives
4-6-2 locomotives